is a 2012 Japanese suspense action comedy film directed by Katsuyuki Motohiro. It was released on September 7, 2012.

Cast
 Yūji Oda as Shunsaku Aoshima
 Toshirō Yanagiba as Shinji Muroi
 Eri Fukatsu as Sumire Onda
 Yūsuke Santamaria as Masayoshi Mashita
 Shun Oguri

Reception
The film was the third highest-grossing domestic film at the Japanese box office in 2012 and, as of January 5, 2015, is the 96th highest-grossing film in Japan, with ¥5.97 billion.

References

External links

2012 action comedy films
2012 films
Films based on television series
Films directed by Katsuyuki Motohiro
Japanese action comedy films
2010s Japanese films